The wicket-keeper in the sport of cricket is the player on the fielding side who stands behind the wicket or stumps being watchful of the batsman and ready to take a catch, stump the batsman out and run out a batsman when occasion arises. The wicket-keeper is the only member of the fielding side permitted to wear gloves and external leg guards. The role of the keeper is governed by Law 27 of the Laws of Cricket.

Stance 
Initially, during the bowling of the ball the wicket-keeper crouches in a full squatting position but partly stands up as the ball is received. Australian wicket-keeper Sammy Carter (1878 to 1948) was the first to squat on his haunches rather than bend over from the waist (stooping).

Purposes 

The keeper's major function is to stop deliveries that pass the batsman (in order to prevent runs being scored as 'byes'), but he can also attempt to dismiss the batsman in various ways:
 The most common dismissal effected by the keeper is for him to catch a ball that has nicked the batsman's bat, called an edge, before it bounces. Sometimes the keeper is also in the best position to catch a ball which has been hit high in the air. More catches are taken by wicket-keepers than by any other fielding position.
 The keeper can stump the batsman by using the ball to remove the bails from the stumps, if the batsman is out of his crease after a delivery has passed the stumps into the keeper's hands. The keeper must then dislodge the bail(s) and the batsman is out if he is still outside the crease.
 When the ball is hit into the outfield, the keeper moves close to the stumps to catch the return throw from a fielder and, if possible, to run out a batsman by collecting the ball in his gloves and putting down the wicket.
 If the batter & non-striker attempt to run a bye following the batsman missing or not playing a shot the wicket keeper can throw the ball at the stumps after he catches the delivery. In outfield cricket it is a rare play due to the high chance of the non-striker being put out. This play is more common during Indoor cricket games and it is common for indoor cricket wicket-keepers to only wear a single glove in order to make throws to the non-striker's end easier to hit with.
 The only example of the Obstructing the field dismissal in Test Cricket came from a batter attempting to hit the ball away from a catch being taken by the wicket-keeper.

A keeper's position depends on the bowler: for fast bowling he will squat some distance from the stumps, in order to have time to react to edges from the batsman, while for slower bowling, he will come much nearer to the stumps (known as "standing up"), to pressure the batsman into remaining within the crease or risk being stumped. The more skilled the keeper, the faster the bowling to which he is able to "stand up", for instance Godfrey Evans often stood up to Alec Bedser.

Like the other players on a cricket team the keepers will bat during the team's batting innings. At elite levels wicket-keepers are generally expected to be proficient batters averaging considerably more than specialist bowlers. This Wicket-keeper-batsman form became popular in the 1990's as the Australian national team saw success when elevating Adam Gilchrist to the team after the retirement of Ian Healy. Healy averaged 27.39 and 4,356 runs total from his 119 Test Matches, and is viewed as a specialist wicket-keeper who had improved his marginally effective batting toward the end of his career. Gilchrist on the other hand was a dominating, powerful batsman from the start, playing 96 Test Matches with a 47.60 average with 5,570 total runs despite playing 23 less matches. Gilchrist's success effectively forced the specialist wicket-keeper into extinction at the top levels of the sport as teams could no long afford to pick a mediocre or poor batsman in the position as long as the player who was chosen could perform up to basic standards of the wicket-keeper position when fielding.

Legal specifications of wicket-keeping gloves 

Law 27.2, which deals with the specifications for wicketkeepers' gloves, states that:
If ... the wicket-keeper wears gloves, they shall have no webbing between the fingers except joining index finger and thumb, where webbing may be inserted as a means of support.
If used, the webbing shall be a single piece of non-stretch material which, although it may have facing material attached, shall have no reinforcements or tucks.
The top edge of the webbing shall not protrude beyond the straight line joining the top of the index finger to the top of the thumb and shall be taut when a hand wearing the glove has the thumb fully extended.

Substitutes 
Substitutes were previously not allowed to keep wicket, but this restriction was lifted in the 2017 edition of the Laws of Cricket.

This rule was sometimes suspended, by agreement with the captain of the batting side. For example, during the England–New Zealand Test match at Lord's in 1986, England's specialist keeper, Bruce French, was injured while batting during England's first innings. England then used four keepers in New Zealand's first innings: Bill Athey kept for the first two overs; 45-year-old veteran Bob Taylor was pulled out of the sponsor's tent to keep for overs 3 to 76; Bobby Parks, the Hampshire keeper, was called up for overs 77 to 140; and Bruce French kept wicket for the final ball of the innings.

Arthur Jones was the first substitute to keep wicket in a Test match, when he did so against Australia at The Oval in 1905. Virat Kohli once happened to substitute MS Dhoni, as the latter had to attend for his nature's call. This incident happened in 2015 during India vs Bangladesh ODI match.

Playing without a wicket-keeper
There is no rule stating a team must play a wicket-keeper. On 5 June 2015 during a T20 Blast game between the Worcestershire Rapids and the Northamptonshire Steelbacks, Worcestershire chose not to play a wicket-keeper in the 16th over of the match. Their keeper, Ben Cox, became an extra fielder at fly slip while spinner Moeen Ali bowled. The umpires consulted with each other and agreed that there was nothing in the rules to prevent it from happening.

Leading international wicket-keepers

Test
The following are the top 10 wicket-keepers by total dismissals in Test cricket.

ODI
The following are the top wicket-keepers by total dismissals in one day cricket.

T20I
The following are the top 10 wicket-keepers by total dismissals in Twenty20 International cricket.

See also
Catcher
Glossary of cricket terms
Wicket-keeper's gloves
Wicket-keeper-batsman

Bibliography 
 Surya Prakash Chaturvedi, Bharat ke Wicket Keepers, National Book Trust, 2011

References 

Cricket terminology
Partial squatting position
Wicket-keepers
Cricket